Pretty Little Liars: The Perfectionists is an American crime thriller mystery drama television series created by I. Marlene King. The series is the third television series on the franchise. It's loosely based on the 2014 novel The Perfectionists by Sara Shepard, but serves as a spin-off and standalone-sequel to Pretty Little Liars. The show premiered on Freeform on March 20, 2019 and concluded on May 22, 2019.

The series features Sofia Carson as Ava Jalali, Sydney Park as Caitlin Park-Lewis, and Eli Brown as Dylan Walker. Sasha Pieterse and Janel Parrish reprise their roles from the original series as Alison DiLaurentis and Mona Vanderwaal.

In September 2019, the series was canceled after one season.

Plot
In a town of Beacon Heights, Oregon, where everything seems perfect, from their top-tier college to their overachieving residents and the stress of needing to be perfect leads to the town's first murder.

Cast and characters

Main
 Sasha Pieterse as Alison DiLaurentis, a new TA at Beacon Heights University (BHU) who is recently separated from her wife (Emily Fields).
 Janel Parrish as Mona Vanderwaal, the head of recruitment and admissions at BHU who selected Alison.
 Sofia Carson as Ava Jalali, a fashionable trendsetter and designer with a talent for hacking and coding.
 Sydney Park as Caitlin Park-Lewis, the intelligent daughter of two overachieving mothers.
 Eli Brown as Dylan Walker, a talented cellist who is extremely critical of himself.
 Hayley Erin as Taylor Hotchkiss, Nolan's sister, who was a teacher at BHU before faking her death.
 Graeme Thomas King as Jeremy Beckett, a charming and witty Brit and Caitlin's secret boyfriend.
 Kelly Rutherford as Claire Hotchkiss, Nolan's mother and founder of Hotchkiss Technologies.

Recurring

 Evan Bittencourt as Andrew Villareal
 Noah Gray-Cabey as Mason Gregory, Nolan's childhood friend and Caitlin's ex-boyfriend.
 Klea Scott as Dana Booker, a former FBI agent and new head of security at BHU.
 Garrett Wareing as Zach Fortson, Ava’s good friend who later becomes her new boyfriend.

Guest
 Chris Mason as Nolan Hotchkiss, a born leader and heir to the Hotchkiss empire.
 Duffy Epstein as Ray Hogadorn, an employee at BHU.
 Phillip Rhys as Michael Jalali, Ava's fugitive father.
 Cycerli Ash as Senator Park-Lewis, one of Caitlin's two mothers.

Production

Development
In November 2014, I. Marlene King was announced to adapt a screenplay for Sara Shepard's novel series The Perfectionists, as the television series. It was later reworked as a sequel of the television show Pretty Little Liars. On September 25, 2017, Freeform ordered a pilot for the series titled Pretty Little Liars: The Perfectionists and the second spin-off series following Ravenswood. On May 14, 2018, the network picked up the series for a 10-episode season, set to air in 2019. I. Marlene King wrote and Elizabeth Allen Rosenbaum directed the first two episodes, which are titled "Pilot" and "Sex, Lies and Alibis". On February 5, 2019, it was announced that the series would premiere on March 20, 2019. On September 27, 2019, Freeform canceled the series after one season.

Casting
On September 25, 2017, Freeform announced that Sasha Pieterse and Janel Parrish had been cast to reprise their roles from mother series Pretty Little Liars as Alison DiLaurentis and Mona Vanderwaal, respectively. On January 29, 2018, it was announced that Sofia Carson had been cast in the role of Ava, one of the series' protagonists.

On March 9, 2018, Deadline Hollywood reported that Kelly Rutherford would be playing Claire Hotchkiss. It was also announced that Sydney Park as Caitlin Park-Lewis, Eli Brown as Dylan Walker, Noah Gray-Cabey as Mason Gregory and Klea Scott as Dana Booker. General Hospital star Hayley Erin was cast in a "mysterious, unnamed role", which later proved to be Taylor Hotchkiss.

Filming
On January 23, 2018, it was announced that the series would be filmed in Portland, Oregon. King confirmed on Twitter that filming would start in March 2018. Production started on February 27, 2018, with a table read for the pilot. Filming for the pilot started on March 12, 2018, and wrapped in the last week of the same month.

Filming for the first season began on October 17, 2018 and wrapped on January 23, 2019.

Music
On May 19, 2018, Michael Suby was announced to compose the series, having previously scored both Pretty Little Liars and Ravenswood. A version of The Pierces' song "Secret", from Pretty Little Liars was performed by Denmark + Winter, serving as the series' theme song. It was released by WaterTower Music on March 22, 2019. It is featured music from musical group Vitamin String Quartet for each of the series episodes including Coldplay's "Clocks" and Lady Gaga's "Poker Face" and "Just Dance".

Episodes

Release

Marketing
A tie-in book edition was based on the series, features the both combined characters are set in the Pretty Little Liars universe. The book was written by Sara Shepard, and released by HarperCollins on May 28, 2019.

Reception

Critical response
Pretty Little Liars: The Perfectionists was met with widespread acclaim from critics, achieving a rating above all seasons of the parent series. On review aggregator Rotten Tomatoes, the series holds an approval rating of 100% based on 11 reviews, with an average rating of 7.87/10. The site's consensus reads: "Visually intriguing and deliciously provocative, Pretty Little Liars: The Perfectionists effectively pays homage to its soapy forebear".

Ratings

Awards and nominations

References

External links
 
 

Pretty Little Liars (franchise)

2019 American television series debuts
2019 American television series endings

2010s American crime drama television series
2010s American college television series
2010s American LGBT-related drama television series
2010s American mystery television series
Freeform (TV channel) original programming
American sequel television series
American television spin-offs
Crossover drama television series
American thriller television series
Crime thriller television series
English-language television shows
Lesbian-related television shows
Bisexuality-related television series
Gay-related television shows
Serial drama television series
Television shows based on American novels
Television series by Alloy Entertainment
Television series by Warner Horizon Television
Television shows filmed in Oregon
Television shows set in Oregon
Television series set in the 2010s
Murder in television
Works about stalking
Television series about revenge